Lawspet is an Assembly Constituency in the union territory of Puducherry in India.

Educational institutions
SABARIVIDHYASHRAM HIGHER SECONDARY SCHOOL
 Fatima Higher Secondary School
 Sri Sithanandha Higher Secondary School
 Tagore Arts College
 Kanchimamunivar Centre for Post Graduate Studies
 Motilal Nehru Government Polytechnic
 Women's Polytechnic
 Community College
 Teacher Training Institute
 Government Technical Higher Secondary School
 Saint Joseph of Cluny Higher Secondary School
 Sri Sankara Vidyalaya Higher Secondary School
 Don Bosco Mat. Hr.sec. school
 Maruti school
 Vivekanandha Higher Secondary School
 Navalar Nedunchezian Government Higher Secondary School
 Vallalar Government Higher Secondary School.

Main areas 
 Lawspet

 Karuvadikuppam
 Pethuchettypet
 Sellaperumalpet
 Shanthi Nagar
 Mahaveer Nagar
 Nehru Ville Nagar
 College Road
 Airport Road
 Ashok Nagar
 Kumaran Nagar
 Kumaran Nagar Extension
 Beasant Nagar
 Kurinji Nagar
 Kurunji Nagar Extension
 Avvai Nagar
 Rajaji Nagar
 Pudupet
 Kottupalayam
 Nesavalar nagar

Religious buildings
 a mosque in airport road
 many temples are situated especially Karuvadikuppam (Sithananda Swamy Temple) Kurinji Nagar(Selva Vinayagar Temple, Ponniamman Temple, etc...)
 Murugan Temple, Mariamman Temple, Ponni amman Temple at Pethuchettypet
 Perumal Temple at Mahaveer Nagar
 Moogambigai Temple at Santhi Nagar
 Saibaba Temple near Airport
 a big church in don bosco campus.      
 Subramaniar Swamy temple in Lawspet.

Hospitals
 Primary Health Centre, Lawspet
 L.K. Nursing Home, Mahaveer Nagar
 MVR Medical Centre, ECR, Lawspet
 Be-well Hospital, ECR, Puducherry

Demographics
Lawspet is one of the most densely populated areas of Puducherry and is popular for the educational institutions. Puducherry domestic airport would be expanded for handling domestic flights from 2013. Previously it was sparingly populated around 1990 and further many government residences and privately owned buildings started coming up.

Cities and towns in Puducherry district